Molecular symmetry in chemistry describes the symmetry present in molecules and the classification of these molecules according to their symmetry.  Molecular symmetry is a fundamental concept in chemistry, as it can be used to predict or explain many of a molecule's chemical properties, such as whether or not it has a dipole moment, as well as its allowed spectroscopic transitions. To do this it is necessary to use group theory. This involves classifying the states of the molecule using the irreducible representations 
from the character table of the symmetry group of the molecule. Symmetry is useful in the study of molecular orbitals, with applications to the Hückel method, to ligand field theory, and to the Woodward-Hoffmann rules. Many university level textbooks on physical chemistry, quantum chemistry, spectroscopy and inorganic chemistry discuss symmetry. Another framework on a larger scale is the use of crystal systems to describe crystallographic symmetry in bulk materials.  
 

There are many techniques for determining the symmetry of a given molecule, including X-ray crystallography and various forms of spectroscopy. Spectroscopic notation is based on symmetry considerations.

Point group symmetry concepts

Elements 
The point group symmetry of a molecule is defined by the presence or absence of 5 types of symmetry element. 

 Symmetry axis: an axis around which a rotation by  results in a molecule indistinguishable from the original.  This is also called an n-fold rotational axis and abbreviated Cn.  Examples are the C2 axis in water and the C3 axis in ammonia. A molecule can have more than one symmetry axis; the one with the highest n is called the principal axis, and by convention is aligned with the z-axis in a Cartesian coordinate system.
 Plane of symmetry: a plane of reflection through which an identical copy of the original molecule is generated.  This is also called a mirror plane and abbreviated σ (sigma = Greek "s", from the German 'Spiegel' meaning mirror). Water has two of them: one in the plane of the molecule itself and one perpendicular to it. A symmetry plane parallel with the principal axis is dubbed vertical (σv) and one perpendicular to it horizontal (σh). A third type of symmetry plane exists: If a vertical symmetry plane additionally bisects the angle between two 2-fold rotation axes perpendicular to the principal axis, the plane is dubbed dihedral (σd). A symmetry plane can also be identified by its Cartesian orientation, e.g., (xz) or (yz).
 Center of symmetry or inversion center, abbreviated i.  A molecule has a center of symmetry when, for any atom in the molecule, an identical atom exists diametrically opposite this center an equal distance from it. In other words, a molecule has a center of symmetry when the points (x,y,z) and (−x,−y,−z) are identical. For example, if there is an oxygen atom in some point (x,y,z), then there is an oxygen atom in the point (−x,−y,−z).  There may or may not be an atom at the inversion center itself.  Examples are xenon tetrafluoride  where the inversion center is at the Xe atom, and benzene where the inversion center is at the center of the ring.
Also called  an n-fold improper rotation axis, it is abbreviated Sn. Examples are present in tetrahedral silicon tetrafluoride, with three S4 axes, and the staggered conformation of ethane with one S6 axis. An S1 axis  corresponds to a mirror plane σ and an S2 axis is an inversion center i. A molecule which has no Sn axis for any value of n is a chiral molecule.
 Identity, abbreviated to E, from the German 'Einheit' meaning unity. This symmetry element simply consists of no change: every molecule has this symmetry element, which is equivalent to a C1 proper rotation. It must be included in the list of symmetry elements so that they form a mathematical group, whose definition requires inclusion of the identity element. It is so called because it is analogous to multiplying by one (unity).

Operations 
  
The five symmetry elements have associated with them five types of symmetry operation, which leave the geometry of the molecule indistinguishable from the starting geometry. They are sometimes distinguished from symmetry elements by a caret or circumflex. Thus, Ĉn is the rotation of a molecule around an axis and Ê is the identity operation. A symmetry element can have more than one symmetry operation associated with it. For example, the C4 axis of the square xenon tetrafluoride (XeF4) molecule is associated with two Ĉ4 rotations in opposite directions (90° and 270°),  a Ĉ2 rotation (180°) and Ĉ1 (0° or 360°).  Because Ĉ1 is equivalent to Ê, Ŝ1 to σ and Ŝ2 to î,  all symmetry operations can be classified as either proper or improper rotations. 

For linear molecules, either clockwise or counterclockwise rotation about the molecular axis by any angle Φ is a symmetry operation.

Symmetry groups

Groups
The symmetry operations of a molecule (or other object) form a group. In mathematics, a group is a set with a binary operation that satisfies the four properties listed below. 

In a symmetry group, the group elements are the symmetry operations (not the symmetry elements), and the binary combination consists of applying first one symmetry operation and then the other. An example is the sequence of a C4 rotation about the z-axis and a reflection in the xy-plane, denoted σ(xy)C4. By convention the order of operations is from right to left.

A symmetry group obeys the defining properties of any group.

 closure property:
  This means that the group is closed so that combining two elements produces no new elements. Symmetry operations have this property because a sequence of two operations will produce a third state indistinguishable from the second and therefore from the first, so that the net effect on the molecule is still a symmetry operation. This may be illustrated by means of a table. For example, with the point group C3, there are three symmetry operations: rotation by 120°, C3, rotation by 240°, C32 and rotation by 360°, which is equivalent to identity, E.
{| class="wikitable"
|+ Point group C3 Multiplication table
|- 
!  !!E   || C3   || C32
|-
!E
| E|| C3 || C32
|-
!C3
|C3||C32||E
|-
!C32
|C32||E||C3
|-
|}
This table also illustrates the following properties
 Associative property:
 existence of identity property:
 existence of inverse element:

The order of a group is the number of elements in the group. For groups of small orders, the group properties can be easily verified by considering its composition table, a table whose rows and columns correspond to elements of the group and whose entries correspond to their products.

Point groups and permutation-inversion groups

The successive application (or composition) of one or more symmetry operations of a molecule has an effect equivalent to that of some single symmetry operation of the molecule. For example, a C2 rotation followed by a σv reflection is seen to be a σv' symmetry operation: σv*C2 = σv'. ("Operation A followed by B to form C" is written BA = C). Moreover, the set of all symmetry operations (including this composition operation) obeys all the properties of a group, given above. So (S,*) is a group, where S is the set of all symmetry operations of some molecule, and * denotes the composition (repeated application) of symmetry operations.

This group is called the point group of that molecule, because the set of symmetry operations leave at least one point fixed (though for some symmetries an entire axis or an entire plane remains fixed). In other words, a point group is a group that summarizes all symmetry operations that all molecules in that category have. The symmetry of a crystal, by contrast, is described by a space group of symmetry operations, which includes translations in space.

One can determine the symmetry operations of the point group for a particular molecule by considering the geometrical symmetry of its molecular model. However, when one uses a point group to classify molecular states, the operations in it are not to be interpreted in the same way. Instead the operations are interpreted as rotating and/or reflecting the vibronic (vibration-electronic) coordinates and these operations commute with the vibronic Hamiltonian. They are "symmetry operations" for that vibronic Hamiltonian. The point group is used to classify by symmetry the vibronic eigenstates of a rigid molecule. The symmetry classification of the rotational levels, the eigenstates of the full (rotation-vibration-electronic) Hamiltonian, requires the use of the appropriate permutation-inversion group as introduced by Longuet-Higgins. Point groups describe the geometrical symmetry of a molecule whereas permutation-inversion groups describe the energy-invariant symmetry.

Examples of point groups
Assigning each molecule a point group classifies molecules into categories with similar symmetry properties. For example, PCl3, POF3, XeO3, and NH3 all share identical symmetry operations. They all can undergo the identity operation E, two different C3 rotation operations, and three different σv plane reflections without altering their identities, so they are placed in one point group, C3v, with order 6. Similarly, water (H2O) and hydrogen sulfide (H2S) also share identical symmetry operations. They both undergo the identity operation E, one C2 rotation, and two σv reflections without altering their identities, so they are both placed in one point group, C2v, with order 4. This classification system helps scientists to study molecules more efficiently, since chemically related molecules in the same point group tend to exhibit similar bonding schemes, molecular bonding diagrams, and spectroscopic properties.
Point group symmetry describes the symmetry of a molecule when fixed at its equilibrium configuration in a particular electronic state. It does not allow for tunneling between minima nor for the change in shape that can come about from the centrifugal distortion effects of molecular rotation.

Common point groups
The following table lists many of the point groups applicable to molecules, labelled using the Schoenflies notation, which is common in chemistry and molecular spectroscopy. The descriptions include common shapes of molecules, which can be explained by the VSEPR model. In each row, the descriptions and examples have no higher symmetries, meaning that the named point group captures all of the point symmetries.

Representations 

A set of matrices that multiply together in a way that mimics the multiplication table of the elements of a group is called a representation of the group. For example, for the C2v point group, the following three matrices are part of a representation of the group:

 
Although an infinite number of such representations exist, the irreducible representations (or "irreps") of the group are all that are needed as all other representations of the group can be described as a linear combination of the irreducible representations.
Also, the irreducibile representations are those matrix representations in which the matrices are in their most diagonal form possible.

Character tables 

For any group, its character table gives a tabulation (for the classes of the group) of the characters (the sum of the diagonal elements) of the matrices of all the irreducible representations of the group. As the number of irreducible representations equals the number of classes, the character table is square.

The representations are labeled according to a set of conventions:

 A, when rotation around the principal axis is symmetrical
 B, when rotation around the principal axis is asymmetrical
 E and T are doubly and triply degenerate representations, respectively
 when the point group has an inversion center, the subscript g ( or even) signals no change in sign, and the subscript u (ungerade or uneven) a change in sign, with respect to inversion.
 with point groups C∞v and D∞h the symbols are borrowed from angular momentum description: Σ, Π, Δ.

The tables also capture information about how the Cartesian basis vectors, rotations about them, and quadratic functions of them transform by the symmetry operations of the group, by noting which irreducible representation transforms in the same way.  These indications are conventionally on the righthand side of the tables.  This information is useful because chemically important orbitals (in particular p and d orbitals) have the same symmetries as these entities.

The character table for the C2v symmetry point group is given below:

 
Consider the example of water (H2O), which has the C2v symmetry described above.  The 2px orbital of oxygen has B1 symmetry as in the fourth row of the character table above, with x in the sixth column). It is oriented perpendicular to the plane of the molecule and switches sign with a C2 and a σv'(yz) operation, but remains unchanged with the other two operations (obviously, the character for the identity operation is always +1). This orbital's character set is thus {1, −1, 1, −1}, corresponding to the B1 irreducible representation. Likewise, the 2pz orbital is seen to have the symmetry of the A1 irreducible representation (i.e.: none of the symmetry operations change it), 2py B2, and the  3dxy orbital A2.  These assignments and others are noted in the rightmost two columns of the table.

Historical background 

Hans Bethe used characters of point group operations in his study of ligand field theory in 1929, and Eugene Wigner used group theory to explain the selection rules of atomic spectroscopy. The first character tables were compiled by László Tisza (1933), in connection to vibrational spectra. Robert Mulliken was the first to publish character tables in English (1933), and E. Bright Wilson used them in 1934 to predict the symmetry of vibrational normal modes. The complete set of 32 crystallographic point groups was published in 1936 by Rosenthal and Murphy.

Molecular rotation and molecular nonrigidity

As discussed above in the section Point groups and permutation-inversion groups, point groups are useful for classifying the vibrational and electronic states of rigid molecules (sometimes called semi-rigid molecules) which undergo only small oscillations about a single equilibrium geometry. Longuet-Higgins introduced a more general type of symmetry group suitable not only for classifying the vibrational and electronic states of rigid molecules but also for classifying their rotational and nuclear spin states. Further, such groups can be used to classify the  states of non-rigid (or fluxional) molecules that tunnel between equivalent geometries (called versions) and to allow for the distorting effects of molecular rotation. These groups are known as permutation-inversion groups, because the symmetry operations in them are energetically feasible permutations of identical nuclei, or  inversion with respect to the center of mass (the parity operation), or a combination of the two.

For example, ethane (C2H6) has three equivalent staggered conformations. Tunneling between the conformations occurs at ordinary temperatures by internal rotation of one methyl group relative to the other. This is not a rotation of the entire molecule about the C3 axis. Although each conformation has D3d symmetry, as in the table above, description of the internal rotation and associated quantum states and energy levels requires the more complete permutation-inversion group G36.

Similarly, ammonia (NH3) has two equivalent pyramidal (C3v) conformations which are interconverted by the process known as nitrogen inversion. This is not the point group inversion operation i used for centrosymmetric rigid molecules (i.e., the inversion of vibrational displacements and electronic coordinates in the nuclear center of mass) since NH3 has no inversion center and is not centrosymmetric. Rather, it is the inversion of the nuclear and electronic coordinates in the molecular center of mass (sometimes called the parity operation), which happens to be energetically feasible for this molecule. The appropriate permutation-inversion group to be used in this situation is D3h(M) which is isomorphic with the point group D3h.

Additionally, as examples, the methane (CH4) and H3+ molecules have highly symmetric equilibrium structures with Td and D3h point group symmetries respectively; they lack permanent electric dipole moments but they do have very weak pure rotation spectra because of rotational
centrifugal distortion. The permutation-inversion groups required for the complete study of CH4 and H3+ are Td(M) and D3h(M), respectively. 

In its ground (N) electronic state the ethylene molecule C2H4 has D2h point group symmetry whereas in the excited (V) state it has D2d symmetry. To treat these two states together it is necessary to allow torsion and to use the double group of the permutation-inversion group G16.

A second and less general approach to the symmetry of nonrigid molecules is due to Altmann. In this approach the symmetry groups are known as Schrödinger supergroups and consist of two types of operations (and their combinations): (1) the geometric symmetry operations (rotations, reflections, inversions) of rigid molecules, and (2) isodynamic operations, which take a nonrigid molecule into an energetically equivalent form by a physically  reasonable process such as rotation about a single bond (as in ethane) or a molecular inversion (as in ammonia).

See also

Character table
Crystallographic point group
Point groups in three dimensions
Symmetry of diatomic molecules
Symmetry in quantum mechanics

References

External links 
Point group symmetry @ Newcastle University
Molecular symmetry @ Imperial College London 
Molecular Point Group Symmetry Tables
Character tables for point groups for chemistry
Molecular Symmetry Online  @ The Open University of Israel
An internet lecture course on molecular symmetry @ Bergische Universitaet
 DECOR – Symmetry @ The Cambridge Crystallographic Data Centre
Details of the relation between point groups and permutation-inversion groups, by Philip Bunker

Symmetry
Theoretical chemistry